Jaroslav Benda (27 April 1882 - January 12, 1970 in Prague) was Czech painter, graphic artist, author, designer of postage stamps and posters, monumental decorations. His contributions significantly affected the development of Czech book graphics.

He graduated from the School of Applied Arts in Prague. From 1907 to 1912 he was an editor of the magazine Světozor. He was advisor to publishers, Jan Laichtr and Jan Štenc for the proposed modification of individual books. From 1920 he was Professor of Applied Arts at the School of Applied Arts. In the years 1926-1928 he was the rector. His students included Zdeněk Seydl, Jaroslav Šváb, Antonín Strnadel, Jiří Trnka and Antonín Homolka.

See also
List of Czech painters

References

Czech illustrators
1882 births
1970 deaths
Artists from Prague
20th-century Czech painters
20th-century Czech male artists
Czech male painters